Razzennest is a 2022 Austrian supernatural, satirical horror film written and directed by Johannes Grenzfurthner. The film was produced by art group monochrom.

Horror and sound play an essential role in the film. Grenzfurthner says that Razzennest forms a trilogy with Masking Threshold and his upcoming film Solvent.

Plot
South African filmmaker and enfant terrible Manus Oosthuizen meets with film critic Babette Cruickshank in a Los Angeles sound studio. With key members of Manus's crew joining, they record an audio commentary track for his new "elegiac feature documentary Razzennest" that cryptically deals with the legacy of the Thirty Years’ War. Strange incidents occur during the recording session; one by one, the film crew members are possessed by the ghosts of soldiers and peasants from 1645, and history repeats itself.

Cast
 Sophie Kathleen Kozeluh (as Babette Cruickshank)
 Michael Smulik (as Manus Oosthuizen)
 Anne Weiner (as Ellen Zampaglione)
 Roland Gratzer (as Hetti Friesenbichler)
 Jim Libby (as Pat Kirkpatrick)
 Bob Rose (as Bob)
 Joe Dante (as Joe Dante, narrator)

Themes
Razzennest combines elements of satire, tragicomedy, drama, horror, and ghost story, but can also be considered a film about filmmaking and a self-reflexive film. In a statement for Daily Dead, Grenzfurthner said:
Razzennest not only gave me the unique opportunity to write a love letter to genre films and rain ridicule on pretentious arthouse films, but also to write a love letter to arthouse films and mock the inherent problems of genre films. It allowed me to realize my decades-old dream of making a film about the Thirty Years’ War and its endless atrocities without needing a budget of millions of dollars to depict the war’s bloody significance. [...] Given the political climate in the United States and other Western societies, the film is a necessary reflection on the undead legacy of murderous Christianity. Grenzfurthner cites Nikolaus Geyrhalter's film Homo Sapiens as an aesthetic template for the kind of arthouse film that he wanted to satirize or "emulate."
Although Grenzfurthner calls Razzennest "bizarre", he remarks that he thinks that it is more accessible than his previous film Masking Threshold.

Production

Filming

Principal photography started on March 2, 2022, entirely in the Rohrwald region, with most of the shots in the villages Oberrohrbach (Leobendorf), Niederhollabrunn, Niederfellabrunn, and Leitzersdorf. Grenzfurthner states that the film "provided an exciting chance to portray a fascinating landscape, the Rohrwald, which is only a few kilometers from where I grew up.

Post-production
Grenzfurthner edited the film himself and mentioned in interviews that he wanted to be as precise as possible with the style and pace of the fictitious director/editor Oosthuizen.

Music
The soundtrack was created by German experimental electronic musician Alec Empire.
Critic Richard Propes writes about the soundtrack: "Alec Empire's original score for the film is an immersive creepster that complements the visuals without dominating them. Empire never tells us what to think or feel, a refreshing approach consistent with Grenzfurthner's own artistry."

Release
Razzennest had its world premiere on 29 September 2022 at Fantastic Fest as part of the Burnt Ends showcase. Festival curator Annick Mahnert calls it "an audio commentary feature film filled with surprises and inside jokes." European premiere took place at the B3 Biennial of the Moving Image in Frankfurt. Festivals like Nightmares Film Festival, A Night of Horror International Film Festival, South African Horrorfest, Cucalorus Film Festival, Feratum Film Festival (Mexico), and BizarroLand Film Festival have screened the film. Austrian premiere will be at Diagonale 2023 in Graz.

Reception

Critical response
Critical response has been positive. The film holds an 93% approval rating on the review aggregator website Rotten Tomatoes, with a weighted average of 7/10. Film Threat awards Razzennest 8/10 and summarizes: "The listener is drawn into the horrific eventualities as the story charts a course from banal film banter to eventually painting the darkest expressions of one’s own imagination. The soundscape and voice acting create an alternate world. Pairing that aural experience with abstract but related visuals brings another level of engagement to the viewer/listener. This is truly madness, but the method behind it creates an effective and unique filmic (and audio) experience." Daily Dead calls Razzennest "genuinely thought-provoking, scary, a bit satirical and bitingly funny." iHorror writes that the film is "an entirely new kind of horror film."
Daily Grindhouse'''s Katelyn Nelson states that the film is "a novel approach to the forced confrontation with history we occasionally seem to need. Not in our faces enough to be decried as obvious or too on-the-nose, but impactful enough to make us think and remember. Is it worse to watch the horrors of war unfold before our eyes, or to hear them reinhabited in the present?" Melissa Hannon of Horror Geek Life states that "the sharp satirical dialogue rarely misses a beat." Timothy Glaraton of Horror Obsessive writes: "The highest form of praise I can give to Razzennest—and the highest form of praise I'll personally give to any film—is that it is truly unlike anything I've ever seen—not simply at Fantastic Fest, but anywhere." Louisa Moore of Screen Zealots says: "From the vivid and violent descriptions to the bloodcurdling screams, Razzennest is the stuff of nightmares."

Awards

 Best Director for Johannes Grenzfurthner for Razzennest at Nightmares Film Festival 2022
 Best Screenplay for Johannes Grenzfurthner for Razzennest at South African Horrorfest 2022
 Best Editing for Johannes Grenzfurthner for Razzennest at South African Horrorfest 2022
 Special Jury Mention for Razzennest at Film Maudit 2.0'' (Los Angeles) 2023

See also
 Art horror
 Supernatural horror film

References

External links

2022 films
Austrian horror films
Austrian independent films
2020s English-language films
2022 multilingual films
2022 horror films
Found footage films
Films shot in Austria
Films set in Austria
Films set in 2022
Films about filmmaking
Self-reflexive films
Films about death
Films about spirit possession
Films about religion
Films critical of religion
Thirty Years' War in popular culture
Films about mercenaries
Films about film directors and producers
Films about films
Monochrom
Films directed by Johannes Grenzfurthner